The Siemens C65 is a mobile phone announced by Siemens. This phone is under “C-Class” leveling of Siemens for entry levels/ consumer regularly. It was released in March 2004. It weighs 86 g and its dimensions are 100 x 45 x 16 mm (length x width x depth). Its display is a 130x130 pixels, 65K colors CSTN LCD. Its carrier-engineered variants are Siemens CT65, CV65 and CO65, exclusively for three mainly mobile operators T-Mobile, Vodafone and O2 respectively. It is known in North America as the Siemens C66.

Reviews
GSM Arena praised it as good value but criticised the poor camera. CNet agreed that it provided good value.

References

Mobile phones introduced in 2004
Mobile phones with infrared transmitter
C65